The 2008–09 San Jose Sharks season was the Sharks' 18th season in the National Hockey League (NHL).

Season events

Pre-season
On June 12, the San Jose Sharks named Todd McLellan their new head coach.

The Sharks traded for defensemen Dan Boyle and Brad Lukowich from the Tampa Bay Lightning and signed Rob Blake.

Former Shark Jeff Friesen tried out for a spot on the team, but the team released him before the season opener.

Kyle McLaren was placed on waivers, just before the regular season began. He was not claimed by any NHL team and was thus sent down to the Sharks' American Hockey League (AHL) affiliate, the Worcester Sharks, to receive more playing time and so that the Sharks could play under the salary cap.

Standings

Divisional standings

Conference standings

Schedule and results
Green background indicates win (2 points).
Red background indicates regulation loss (0 points).
White background indicates overtime/shootout loss (1 point).

Playoffs

Player statistics

Skaters

Goaltenders

†Denotes player spent time with another team before joining Sharks. Stats reflect time with the Sharks only.
‡Traded mid-season
Bold/italics denotes franchise record

Awards and records

Awards
Pacific Division Champions
President's Trophy

Records
Most points by one team in Pacific Division history (117)

Milestones

Transactions

Trades

Sharks acquired defensemen Dan Boyle and Brad Lukowich for defenseman Matt Carle, defensive prospect Ty Wishart, a first-round-pick in the 2009 NHL Entry Draft and a fourth-round-pick in the 2010 NHL Entry Draft.

Traded defenseman Craig Rivet to Buffalo Sabres for a second-round pick in the 2009 NHL Entry Draft and a second-round-pick in the 2010 NHL Entry Draft.

Free agents

Claimed from waivers

Draft picks
San Jose's picks at the 2008 NHL Entry Draft in Ottawa, Ontario.

Farm teams
The Sharks affiliate in the American Hockey League was the Worcester Sharks. The Worcester club finished in fourth place in the AHL's Atlantic Division with 42 wins and 35 losses. Worcester's leading scorer was Mike Iggulden with 29 goals and 66 points.

References

San Jose Sharks seasons
S
S
Presidents' Trophy seasons
San Jose Sharks
San Jose Sharks